Christopher Stewart Dorrian (born 3 April 1982) is an English former footballer who played as a defender.

Career
Dorrian began his career in the academy at Leyton Orient, making his debut for the club in a 1–0 win against Plymouth Argyle in the Third Division on 12 August 2000, deputising in place for the injured Matt Joseph. In August 2001, Dorrian was sent out on loan to Dover Athletic. At Dover, Dorrian made 14 league appearances in a four-month loan spell. After a further seven appearances in all competitions for Leyton Orient, Dorrian was released by the club in March 2002. At the end of the 2001–02 season, following his release from Orient, Dorrian made four appearances for Chelmsford City.

In 2002, Dorrian signed for hometown club Harlow Town. Following his time at Harlow, Dorrian played for Bishop's Stortford, Thurrock, Sawbridgeworth Town and Takeley.

References

1982 births
Living people
Association football defenders
English footballers
Sportspeople from Harlow
Leyton Orient F.C. players
Dover Athletic F.C. players
Chelmsford City F.C. players
Harlow Town F.C. players
Bishop's Stortford F.C. players
English Football League players
Southern Football League players
Essex Senior Football League players